Alexis Rodríguez may refer to:

 Alexis Rodríguez (footballer), Argentine footballer
 Alexis Rodríguez (wrestler), Cuban wrestler